Kula Municipality may refer to:

 Kula, Bulgaria, a town and municipality in Vidin Province
 Kula (Serbia), a town and municipality in Vojvodina

See also
 Kula (disambiguation)